Joaquim Goés is a scientist at the Bigelow Laboratory for Ocean Sciences, Maine, USA who has been awarded the International Takeda Techno-Entrepreneurship Award in Environmental Sciences for his research on the Influence of Solar Ultraviolet Radiation in Marine Ecosystems.

Goés' research focuses on new methods to evaluate and predict the effects of Ozone depletion and its implications for human health and ecosystems as well as methods for managing and minimizing these risks.

Goés, from the region of Goa along the Indian west coast, was earlier part of the National Institute of Oceanography at Dona Paula.

References

Goans in science and technology
Indian oceanographers
Living people
Year of birth missing (living people)